The  is a dam in the city of Yūbari, Hokkaidō, Japan.

Dams in Hokkaido
Dams completed in 1962